The 2016–17 EHF Champions League group stage began on 21 September 2016 and concluded on 12 March 2017. A total of 28 teams competed for 14 places in the knockout stage of the 2016–17 EHF Champions League.

Draw
The draw for the group stage was held on 1 July 2016.

Seedings
The seedings were announced on 27 June 2016.

Format
In each group, teams played against each other in a double round-robin format, with home and away matches. After completion of the group stage matches, the teams advancing to the knockout stage were determined in the following manner:

Groups A and B – the top team qualified directly for the quarter-finals, and the five teams ranked 2nd–6th advance to the first knockout round.
Groups C and D – the top two teams from both groups contested a playoff to determine the last two sides joining the 10 teams from Groups A and B in the first knockout round.

Tiebreakers
In the group stage, teams were ranked according to points (2 points for a win, 1 point for a draw, 0 points for a loss). After completion of the group stage, if two or more teams have scored the same number of points, the ranking was determined as follows (article 4.3.1, section II of regulations):

Highest number of points in matches between the teams directly involved;
Superior goal difference in matches between the teams directly involved;
Highest number of goals scored in matches between the teams directly involved (or in the away match in case of a two-team tie);
Superior goal difference in all matches of the group;
Highest number of plus goals in all matches of the group;
If the ranking of one of these teams is determined, the above criteria are consecutively followed until the ranking of all teams is determined. If no ranking can be determined, a decision shall be obtained by EHF through drawing of lots.

During the group stage, only criteria 4–5 apply to determine the provisional ranking of teams.

Groups
The matchdays were 21–25 September, 28 September–2 October, 5–9 October, 12–16 October, 19–23 October, 9–13 November, 16–20 November, 23–27 November, 30 November–4 December 2016 and 8–12 February 2017. For Groups A and B, additional matchdays include, 15–19 February, 22–26 February, 1–5 March and 8–12 March 2016.

Group A

Group B

Group C

Group D

Playoffs

Matches

HBC Nantes won 68–56 on aggregate.

Montpellier Handball won 65–63 on aggregate.

References

External links
Official website

Group stage